Income splitting is a tax policy of fictionally attributing earned and passive income of one spouse to the other spouse for the purposes of assessing personal income tax (i.e. "splitting" away the income of the greater earner, reducing his/her income for tax measurement purposes), thus reducing tax rates paid by the spouse who earns more and increasing rates paid by a spouse who earns less (or nothing).

Global incidence and ramifications for sovereign debt and fertility rates 
Most Western countries have abolished mandatory fictional income splitting, while in several countries fictional income splitting is optional (if the couple chooses it). A 2009 study of 26 European countries found that: "In France, Liechtenstein, Luxembourg and Portugal, couples are jointly assessed. Ireland and Germany operate joint taxation, respectively, with an option for individual taxation and the right to be individually  taxed when this is more advantageous; conversely individual taxation is the default option in Spain and Poland, but the option of joint assessment is offered. Elements of jointness remain in some income tax codes for which the individual is the unit of taxation – the Belgian, Estonian, Greek, Icelandic and Norwegian codes – some of which are minor while others matter. The remaining countries enforce individual income taxation without exceptions".

In 2015, Portugal abolished the mandatory joint taxation of a family, establishing separate taxation for married (or de facto unions) taxpayers as the norm, with an option being available for joint taxation.

The International Monetary Fund has called for the countries to abandon the practice of taxing family income instead of individual income, along with other tax practices, such as the method of assessing payroll tax in the United States, which assesses extra taxes, higher tax rates, and reduced benefits to families that have two earners, and provides funded and unfunded subsidies to patriarchal families, which are related to sovereign debt problems in these countries.

In the United States, the spouse to whom the income is fictionally attributed does not pay payroll tax on that "split" earned income, while the benefit of that spouse's lower rate does accrue to the greater earner. The "split" is thus ignored in that context while it is applied in the income tax context. Even though the fictionally earning spouse does not pay payroll tax, the couple draws two sets of Social Security and Medicare benefits.

Declining fertility rates in countries that subsidize patriarchal/maternalist marriage and rebounding fertility rates in countries that shift their policies to recognizing equal parental responsibility are also a factor in many countries abandoning fictional income splitting for tax measurement.

In part because of these concerns, as well as child welfare policies that advocate recognizing both parents having personal responsibility for children in order to support their development without distortion, fictional income splitting is becoming rare globally, and, since 1970, it has been abolished in many countries.

Some countries require joint returns but measure the tax on income individually, while others use only individual returns. Tax laws in these countries generally have regulations preventing the direct transfer of earned income from one spouse to another to reduce taxes. There are often still methods of using income splitting to reduce taxes in these jurisdictions. For those who own their own company, hiring family members will often reduce the overall tax burden by shifting income to lower-income family members.

United States 
In the United States, tax benefits or "marriage bonuses" to married couples with only one breadwinner (or with a breadwinner earning the bulk of the couple's income) have been cited by the Tax Policy Center as one of the debt-ballooning policies of the Bush tax cuts. The Tax Policy Center asserts that these "marriage bonuses" (received by the greater or sole earner in the marriage) and "marriage penalties" (paid by the lesser or non-earner in the marriage) are often subsidized by single people and two-earner marriages or are unfunded and thus contribute to government borrowing.

While its effects on the national debt have increased substantially in recent years, income splitting became required for married persons filing jointly in the United States in 1948. After two successive vetoes by President Harry S. Truman, a GOP-led effort in Congress obtained enough votes to institute the splitting of marital income. Until then, only single filing was permitted. However, couples in community property states such as California had access to de facto fictional income splitting, since one-half of the income of one spouse could be fictionally attributed to the other spouse. This led to issues of patriarchal taxpayers in community property states paying lower tax rates than patriarchal taxpayers in common law states and hastened the passage of de jure income splitting. While other solutions to this distortion in community property states were available, political activism to establish a male entitlement (or first right) to paid work, and to push women back into unpaid or lower paid work after their substantial economic contributions during World War II, led to the override of Truman's double veto.

Fictional income splitting is strongly opposed by people in two-earner marriages, and especially by those in Shared Earning/Shared Parenting Marriages.  U.S. economists Betsey Stevenson and Justin Wolfers are among those who oppose it.  The opposition also comes from those who see this type of taxation contributing to problems of child neglect, particularly by fathers, family breakdown, unequal pay for equal work problems for women, poverty in general, and the feminization of poverty, particularly in older women.

Germany 
In Germany, income splitting involves two aspects. First, if married couples file jointly, their total tax liability is determined by twice the tax liability of applying half the total taxable income. Let  and  denote each spouse's taxable income. The splitting advantage increases if both partners have unequal incomes. Another consequence is a high marginal tax rate for the secondary earner, as the secondary earner indirectly pays the marginal tax rate of the higher-earning spouse.

The second aspect involves the Withholding tax (Lohnsteuer) which is paid on employment income. Family taxation implies that married couples may split the total basic exemption (Grundfreibetrag). This is done via choosing the appropriate tax bracket (Steuerklasse). The higher-earning spouse predominantly opts for Steuerklasse III to claim both exemptions, while the lower-earning spouse will be taxed without exemption (Steuerklasse V).

Both arrangements are widely considered to create an incentive for unequal employment within married couples in Germany, providing one cause for low labor force participation among married women.

Canada 
Income splitting was not a part of Canada's tax system until the 21st century. From the introduction of income tax, Canadian households were almost exclusively deemed to be single income households. In 1962, a Royal Commission on Taxation was initiated under Kenneth Carter by Prime Minister John Diefenbaker to examine and to recommend improvements to the federal tax system. The report declared "that fairness should be the foremost objective of the taxation system; the existing system was not only too complicated and inefficient, but under it the poor paid more than their fair share while the wealthy avoided taxes through various loopholes."

From the Carter commission's report:
"We conclude that the present system is lacking in essential fairness between families in similar circumstances and that attempts to prevent abuses of the system have produced serious anomalies and rigidities. Most of these results are inherent in the concept that each individual is a separate taxable entity. Taxation of the individual in almost total disregard for his inevitably close financial and economic ties with the other members of the basic social unit of which he is ordinarily a member, the family, is in our view another striking instance of the lack of a comprehensive and rational pattern in the present tax system. In keeping with our general theme that the scope of our tax concepts should be broadened and made more consistent in order to achieve equity, we recommend that the family be treated as a tax unit and taxed on a rate schedule applicable to family units. Individuals who are not members of a family unit would continue to be treated as separate tax units and would be taxed on a schedule applicable to individuals."

The 1970 Royal Commission on the Status of Women recommended a system of elective joint taxation to address the issues of both tax fairness between families and concerns regarding disincentives for women's participation in the work force.

Combined family income is used to calculate a family's tax liability as well as to determine a family's eligibility for tax-delivered benefit payments, such as the Canada Child Tax Benefit (CCTB). Households of similar gross incomes are bearing broadly different tax obligations. On an individual basis this is not the case. Households with the same total income are eligible for identical tax-delivered benefit payments but may have significantly different tax liabilities. Further, while bearing the same general costs of everyday life, such as child care, one jointly filing family is unable to experience greater tax relief (available to individually filing parents), due to the requirement that child care expenses be applied to the lower spouse's income.

After enacting income splitting for retired couples in 2006, in 2011 the Conservative Party of Canada led by Stephen Harper won a majority government with a platform promising limited income splitting. The proposed policy would allow families, with children under 18, to split their household income of up to $50,000, once the federal budget was balanced. The Tories estimate that almost 1.8 million families would be able to capitalize on the tax package and they would save an average of $1,300 annually.

A 2013 study by the C.D. Howe Institute concluded that incoming splitting "does more harm than good," and a 2014 study by the Canadian Centre for Policy Alternatives claims that would primarily benefit wealthier families.

However, the C.D. Howe Institute study went far beyond the scope of the limited proposal in the Conservative campaign platform by including the consequences of the provinces following suit. It also speculates upon the effects of workforce participation of the lower earning spouse which is easily addressed by elective joint taxation such as recommended by the 1970 Royal Commission on the Status of Women.

In February 2014, a day after introducing the 2014 budget, Finance Minister Jim Flaherty distanced himself from the concept of income splitting, but others within the Cabinet still support the idea.

The 2015 Canadian federal budget proposed measures to allow families to split their income.

See also
 Bachelor tax
 Marriage penalty
 Shared earning/shared parenting marriage

References

Income taxes